William Craner (17 July 1906 – 12 January 1987) was a British sprinter. He competed in the men's 4 × 400 metres relay at the 1928 Summer Olympics.

References

1906 births
1987 deaths
Athletes (track and field) at the 1928 Summer Olympics
British male sprinters
Olympic athletes of Great Britain
Place of birth missing